Roady Kenehan (May 1, 1856 – January 5, 1927) was an Irish-born American labor union leader.

Born in Queen's County, Ireland, Kenehan emigrated to the United States in 1873, settling in Philadelphia.  In 1878, he gradually headed west, prospecting for gold, until he reached Denver, where he became a horseshoer.  He joined what became the International Union of Journeymen Horseshoers, becoming president of his local, and its delegate to the Denver Trades and Labor Assembly.

In 1890, Kenehan was elected as secretary-treasurer of his union, also serving a term as a vice-president of the American Federation of Labor in 1895, and editing the  International Horseshoers' Monthly Magazine from 1899.  In about 1897, he was appointed to the Colorado State Labor Board of Arbitration.

In 1908, Kenehan was elected as State Auditor of Colorado, representing the Democratic Party.  He left his union posts in 1910, and in 1911 became the Colorado State Treasurer.  In 1912, he was re-elected as State Auditor.  In this role, he opposed funding the Colorado National Guard to act as strikebreakers.  He ran to become State Treasurer again in 1914, but was defeated.  He served on the state Draft Board during World War I, became federation director of labor for Colorado in 1918, and then supervisor of the census in Colorado in 1919.  In 1921, he became a tax agent, retiring in 1923.

References

1856 births
1927 deaths
American trade union leaders
Irish emigrants to the United States (before 1923)
People from County Offaly
State Auditors of Colorado
State treasurers of Colorado